Upbeat Love is the debut album by the band Threatmantics. It was released on 3 November 2008 by Domino Records imprint Double Six Records.

Track listing
"Big Man"
"Buried Alive"
"Don't Care"
"Get Outta Town"
"High Waister"
"James Lemain"
"Little Bird"
"Lonely Heart"

2008 albums
Double Six Records albums